Jon García Aguado (born 28 September 1977 in Durango, Vizcaya, Spain) is a Spanish taekwondo athlete.

References
 Profile

1977 births
Living people
Spanish male taekwondo practitioners
Taekwondo practitioners at the 2004 Summer Olympics
Taekwondo practitioners at the 2008 Summer Olympics
Olympic taekwondo practitioners of Spain
European Taekwondo Championships medalists
World Taekwondo Championships medalists
20th-century Spanish people
21st-century Spanish people